Emamzadeh Khuraq (also Romanized as Emāmzādeh Khūraq; also known as Khvoraq) is a village in Shahsavan Kandi Rural District, in the Central District of Saveh County, Markazi Province, Iran. At the 2006 census, its population was 22, in 9 families.

References 

Populated places in Saveh County